Thomas Rolph (January 17, 1885 – May 10, 1956) was a United States representative from California.  He was born in San Francisco, California. His older brother was James Rolph, Jr., who would be elected as Mayor of San Francisco in 1911 and later as Governor of California in 1930.

Biography 
Rolph attended public schools and graduated from Humboldt Evening High School. In 1912, he founded a building materials sales agency, which he headed until his death.

Rolph was elected as a Republican to the Seventy-seventh and Seventy-eighth Congresses (January 3, 1941 - January 3, 1945). He was an unsuccessful candidate for reelection in 1944 to the Seventy-ninth Congress. He returned to his building material sales agency and died in San Francisco in 1956. He was buried in Cypress Lawn Memorial Park, Colma, San Mateo County, California.

References

External links 
 

1885 births
1956 deaths
Politicians from San Francisco
Republican Party members of the United States House of Representatives from California
20th-century American politicians
Burials at Cypress Lawn Memorial Park